Anne Kremer was the defending champion, but lost in quarterfinals to tournament winner Patty Schnyder.

Schnyder won the title by defeating Henrieta Nagyová 6–0, 6–4 in the final.

Seeds

Draw

Finals

Top half

Bottom half

References

External links
 Official results archive (ITF)
 Official results archive (WTA)

Singles
Volvo Women's Open - Singles
 in women's tennis